The Cross of Salem,  also known as a pontifical cross because it is carried before the Pope, is similar to a patriarchal cross, but with an additional crossbar below the main crossbar, equal in length to the upper crossbar. It is also similar to the Eastern Cross. The Cross of Salem is also used by the supreme leadership of Scottish and York Rite Freemasonry.

References

See also
 Christian cross

Cross symbols
Catholic theology and doctrine
Salem